William Curtis,  M.A. (1695–1757) was an Irish Anglican priest.

Curtis was born in Preston, Lancashire and educated at Trinity College, Dublin, He was a Prebendary of Leighlin Cathedral from 1731 to 1733; Archdeacon of Leighlin from 1733 to 1735; and Archdeacon of Ferns from 1735 until his death.

Notes

Alumni of Trinity College Dublin
Irish Anglicans
1757 deaths
1695 births
Clergy from Preston, Lancashire
Archdeacons of Leighlin
[[Category:Archdeacons of Ferns}]]